Ted Casablanca (born Bruce Wallace Bibby; November 20, 1960) is an American entertainment journalist and gossip columnist. He had an E! Online column called The Awful Truth, which ran for sixteen years, ending in July 2012.

Biography

Career
Casablanca is the gallery owner of Ted Casablanca Gallery in Palm Springs, CA. Casablanca began writing for Premiere magazine in 1987, where he originally conceived his gossip column "The Awful Truth" before transferring it to E! in 1996 as a weekly (later daily) column. He regularly presented it on E! Television and sometimes appeared as a correspondent and commentator for various E! Television events. Casablanca earned notoriety for delving into the personal lives and relationships of celebrities in "The Awful Truth"; Casablanca often attributed pseudonyms to the subjects of his pieces, and garnered attention with his satirical speculation on the clandesciently homosexual status of particular celebrities. As Bruce Bibby, he has written for a number of entertainment magazines and has been a contributor to the television magazine Hard Copy.

Television and Film Appearances
Casablanca has appeared on several television series, usually as a commentator, but he has also appeared as himself on Grosse Pointe and, more recently, in an episode of General Hospital in February 2007.

In 2006, he provided commentary alongside cast member Barbara Parkins for the special edition DVD of Valley of the Dolls. He also appeared in the featurette on the bonus DVD entitled, The Divine Ms. Susann. Casablanca has been a long-time fan of the film. The name "Ted Casablanca" was borrowed from a minor character from Valley of the Dolls. According to IMDB, Casablanca also served as an uncredited technical advisor for the film Bright Lights, Big City.

Personal
Bruce Wallace Bibby (Ted Casablanca) was born November 20, 1960 in Dallas county Texas to Robert and Alice Wallace Bibby. Casablanca also earned a degree in sculpture from the California Institute of the Arts before turning to journalism.

According to his own column, Casablanca married Jon Powell in Hawaii in May 2008. But on September 16, 2009, Casablanca announced that he and Powell had, after a separation, decided to end their union.  Casablanca was also notably paired with actor Harvey Fierstein from 1987 to 1992.  Casablanca now resides in Carmichael, California.

References

External links

1960 births
Living people
American infotainers
American gay writers
American gossip columnists
American online journalists
American LGBT journalists
Writers from Texas